Anush Mahalleh-ye Jow Kandan (also Romanized as Anūsh Maḩalleh-ye Jow Kandān; also known as Alūsh Maḩalleh, Anūsh Maḩalleh, and Khvājeh Karī) is a village in Saheli-ye Jokandan Rural District, in the Central District of Talesh County, Gilan Province, Iran. At the 2006 census, its population was 2,162, in 457 families.

Language 
Linguistic composition of the village.

References 

Populated places in Talesh County

Azerbaijani settlements in Gilan Province

Talysh settlements in Gilan Province